Ishaa Saha is an Indian actress who mainly works in Bengali cinema. She started her career with Bengali television. She made her film debut in Bengali cinema in 2017 as a lead with Projapoti Biskut directed by Anindya Chatterjee. She acted in all the films directed by filmmaker Dhrubo Banerjee.

Early life and education
Saha was born in Kolkata (26 February 1990). Saha passed Bachelor of Laws in 2015 from University of Calcutta and started her career as a television artist in 2016 with Star Jalsha's Jhanjh Lobongo Phool as Lobongo.

Career
She made her film debut in 2017, with the family drama Projapoti Biskut directed by Anindya Chatterjee, which was critically and commercially successful. She received praise for her performance and received a 3rd Filmfare Awards East for Critics' Award for Best Actor (Female). In 2018, Saha played the role of Jhinuk, a girl next door, alongside Abir Chatterjee and Arjun Chakrabarty as female protagonist in the 'Guptodhon' franchise (Guptodhoner Sondhane (2018) and Durgeshgorer Guptodhon (2019)). Saha gained wider recognition for her performance in Sweater, the film also turned out to be a box office success. Both Sweater and Durgeshgorer Guptodhon are in the 'Top Rated Bengali Movies Of 2019' list. She will next star in Dhrubo Banerjee's Golondaaj, opposite Dev.

Filmography

Television

Web series

References

External links 
 Ishaa on Twitter
 

Living people
Actresses from Kolkata
Indian film actresses
Indian television actresses
Indian web series actresses
Bengali actresses
Year of birth missing (living people)
Actresses in Bengali cinema
Actresses in Bengali television
University of Calcutta alumni
21st-century Indian actresses